The Wicked Years is a series of novels by Gregory Maguire that present a revisionist take on L. Frank Baum's The Wonderful Wizard of Oz, its 1939 film adaptation, and related books.

This is a very different and cynical look at Oz than its depictions in the books by L. Frank Baum or the film(s). Unlike the originals, these books are targeted limitedly for mature readers, meaning they are not intended for children. This Oz is beset with many social problems like the discrimination against sentient animals (called Animals in the book) and racial tensions between the various human ethnic groups in Oz. Many of the protagonists in the Wizard of Oz are presented either as antagonists or neutral.

The first book in the series, Wicked, was adapted into a successful musical of the same name.

The novels
There are four books in the series. In 2021, the author continues with the story with the first novel in a three book series called: "Another Day."

The first novel, published in 1995, was Wicked: The Life and Times of the Wicked Witch of the West, a book detailing the life of the infamous villain from Baum's books, now called "Elphaba". It is told through the various perspectives of those who knew Elphaba (who would become branded as the Wicked Witch of the West), an outcast aspiring social reformer with an allergy to water. The novel was a huge success, and was later adapted into a smash hit musical, which opened on Broadway on October 30, 2003.

A sequel, Son of a Witch, was published in 2005, and detailed the life of Elphaba's son Liir. It is told through the perspective of her son Liir who is trying to find his half-sister Nor and incidentally finishes some of Elphaba's work. It begins not long after the end of "Wicked."

A third novel was published in 2008, titled A Lion Among Men; the protagonist being the Cowardly Lion, now called 'Brrr'. His history from cubhood to current time of the book is given in parallel with the history of the oracle Yackle, who was introduced in "Wicked." Their stories overlap with "Wicked" and "Son of Witch", carrying the story about  eight years past "Son of a Witch." Lion was the first book to introduce the title "Wicked Years".

The fourth and final book, Out of Oz, was published in 2011. It begins immediately after the end of "Lion" and focuses on Liir's daughter Rain. The promotional info stated that the novel "will feature all sorts of magical mayhem, with the Emerald City plotting an attack on Munchkinland, while the Cowardly Lion runs for his life. Young Dorothy pops in for "something more than a cameo."

In 2021, the author continued the story with a fifth book, The Brides of Maracoor. It is the first in a three book series called "Another Day." This novel focuses on the wicked witch's granddaughter, Rain.  The brides of Maracoor form a kind of flagellant community of quasi-nuns. They spend their days weaving, for their job is to braid "the nets of time.”  The second installment, The Oracle of Maracoor was published in 2022. The third part, The Witch of Maracoor is slated for publication in October, 2023.

The Grimmerie
The Grimmerie (a variation on the words 'Grimoire' and 'gramarye') is a fictional book of spells in The Wicked Years universe. In both the original novels and the stage adaptation, the Grimmerie is written in a language that the people of Oz cannot read; in the novels, this is because the book came from Earth and is written in English, whereas in the musical, it is said to be written in the "lost language of spells".  The Grimmerie is also the title of a behind-the-scenes book about the musical, published in the year 2005.

In the novel, the Grimmerie contains information on various supernatural creatures, including angels and an entire section on "Evil Particulars" (i.e. demons), methods of poisoning water and breeding a docile population, as well as diagrams of instruments of torture and weapons which Elphaba considers "too vile to use".  It also contains:

A recipe entitled "Of apples with black skin and white flesh: to fill the stomach with greed unto Death".
A recipe to overthrow a regime, which suggests spells for various methods of sabotage and assassination.
Spells for 'unleashing the hidden energies of matter'.
Spells to tamper with time.
A spell "On the Administration of Dragons". This page plays an important part in the plot of Son of a Witch, where Shell Thropp, the Emperor Apostle, presents this page to Trism bon Cavalish.
Spells to encourage flight in originally earth-bound animals
Various 'marginalia on how to keep awake', which Elphaba combines with home remedies to produce a powerful insomnia potion
'A spell to reveal hidden inscription [...]Perhaps even the location of individuals in hiding'. The reverse side of the page on the Administration of Dragons contains the second half of this spell.
 A spell entitled "To Call Winter on Water," used by Glinda to trap war ships advancing on Munchkinland in ice, in the beginning of Out of Oz

In the musical, the Grimmerie is a pivotal instrument in Elphaba's magical powers.  It contains a variety of incantations, written in a strange language, that allow her to perform various spells throughout the musical; the contents are considerably less gruesome than those of its novel counterpart.

Inconsistencies
The series exhibits occasional continuity errors and factual inaccuracies.

In Wicked, some Ozian characters wonder if Dorothy is of royal blood, because her name is a near-anagram of Theodore, the man who rules her country. In Out of Oz, it is revealed that the Kansas twister sent Dorothy to Oz in 1900, when Theodore Roosevelt was only a candidate for the Vice Presidency. His abrupt accession to the US Presidency did not occur until September 1901.

In Out of Oz, Dorothy and her family purchase fortune cookies at a Chinese restaurant in San Francisco in April 1906. At the time, fortune cookies were known as fortune tea cakes and were a Japanese-Californian specialty. They were not appropriated by Chinese-Californians until the 1940s as a result of the internment years.

References

External links
 http://www.ology.com/arts/gregory-maguires-out-oz-hit-bookstores-november

 
Book series introduced in 1995
Novels by Gregory Maguire
Oz (franchise) books
Parallel literature
HarperCollins books